William Gordon Mackendrick (23 August 1864 – 22 September 1959) was a Canadian soldier and author.

Biography
Mackendrick was born in Galt, Ontario. He served in the First World War with the Canadian Expeditionary Force. In 1916 he was seconded to the British 5th army and promoted to Lieutenant-Colonel in charge of roads. He served with Sir. Edmund Allenby in the Sinai and Palestine Campaign against the Ottoman Empire.

With the pen name "The Roadbuilder", he wrote religious themed books on British Israelism. He died in Oakville, Ontario in 1959.

Publications 
 The Destiny of Britain and America, (1921)
 The Freedom of the Seas, (1929)
 God's Commonwealths, British and American, (1930)
 God's Economic Plan, (1932)
 This is Armageddon, (1942)

Sources:

References

External links
 

1864 births
1959 deaths
20th-century Canadian non-fiction writers
British Empire
British Israelism
Canadian military personnel of World War I
Mackendrick